Raymond Eugene Plummer (March 27, 1913 – December 26, 1987) was a United States district judge of the United States District Court for the District of Alaska.

Early life and education

Born in Harlan, Iowa, Plummer received a Bachelor of Arts degree from the University of Nebraska–Lincoln in 1937 and a Bachelor of Laws from the University of Nebraska College of Law in 1939.

Career 
Plummer worked in private practice of law in Dallas, Texas from 1939 to 1940. He was in private practice of law in Lincoln, Nebraska from 1940 to 1944. He was an assistant United States attorney of the District of Alaska Territory from 1944 to 1946. He was the United States attorney for the District of Alaska Territory from 1946 to 1949. He was in private practice of law in Anchorage, Territory of Alaska from 1949 to 1961.

Federal judicial service

Plummer was nominated by President John F. Kennedy on August 28, 1961, to the United States District Court for the District of Alaska, to a new seat created by 75 Stat. 80. He was confirmed by the United States Senate on September 8, 1961, and received his commission on September 18, 1961. He served as Chief Judge from 1966 to 1973. He assumed senior status due to a certified disability on June 1, 1973. His service was terminated on December 26, 1987, due to his death.

References

External links
 
 Raymond Plummer at 100 Years of Alaska's Legislature

1913 births
1987 deaths
Alaska Democrats
Judges of the United States District Court for the District of Alaska
Members of the Alaska Territorial Legislature
20th-century American politicians
Nebraska lawyers
Lawyers from Anchorage, Alaska
People from Harlan, Iowa
Texas lawyers
United States district court judges appointed by John F. Kennedy
20th-century American judges
University of Nebraska alumni
Assistant United States Attorneys